HMS Sable was a  destroyer that served with the Royal Navy during the First World War. The R class were an improvement on the previous M class with geared steam turbines to improve efficiency. Laid down by J. Samuel White at East Cowes on the Isle of Wight, the destroyer was launched in November 1916 and joined the Grand Fleet. Service during the war was mostly uneventful, apart from a  collision with fellow R class destroyer . After the War, the destroyer was placed in reserve and decommissioned, being sold to be broken up in August 1927. In a twist of fate,Salmon was renamed Sable in 1933.

Design and development

Sable was one of seventeen  delivered to the British Admiralty as part of the Sixth War Construction Programme. The design was generally similar to the preceding M class, but differed in having geared turbines, the central gun mounted on a bandstand and minor changes to improve seakeeping.

Three funnels were fitted.

Armament consisted of three single  Mk IV guns on the ship's centreline, with one on the forecastle, one aft on a raised platform and one between the second and third funnels. A single 2-pounder "pom-pom" anti-aircraft gun was carried on a platform between two twin mounts for  torpedoes. The ship had a complement of 82 officers and ratings.

Construction and career
Ordered in July 1915, Sable was laid down by J. Samuel White at East Cowes on the Isle of Wight with the yard number 1477, and launched on 28 June the following year. The vessel was the first of the name, recalling the species of Marten. The destroyer was completed on 30 November 1916 and was deployed as part of the Grand Fleet, joining the Fifteenth Destroyer Flotilla, remaining until the end of the war.

The destroyer was soon on active service and, on 29 January 1917, joined a flotilla led by leader  that sought to engage German destroyers in a sweep of the English Channel. On 12 February, four German large torpedo boats attacked the regular convoy between Britain and Norway, overwhelming the escort of two destroyers ( and ) and four naval trawlers. All the escort except Pellew were sunk, as were all six merchant ships. Sable picked up survivors from one of the trawlers, later that day. The mission encountered heavy seas that caused substantial damage, but was a success. The ship later undertook anti-submarine patrols. Also during the year, the ship collided with sister ship , sustaining damage to the bridge. Both ships made it successfully back to port.

After the Armistice, Sable helped to escort the surrendered German fleet to its internment and subsequent scuttling at Scapa Flow. During 1919, the ship was moved to Plymouth and reduced to reserve. On 28 July 1921, the destroyer was moved to Portland.
However, in 1923, the Navy decided to scrap many of the older destroyers in preparation for the introduction of newer and larger vessels. Sable was one of the destroyers chosen for retirement. During August 1927, Sable was sold to Hughes Bolckow of Blyth, Northumberland and subsequently broken up. The name was subsequently taken in 1933 by the very Salmon that had collided with the destroyer earlier in her career.

Pennant numbers

References

Citations

Bibliography
 
 
 
 
 
 
 
 
 
 
 
 
 
 

1916 ships
R-class destroyers (1916)
Ships built on the Isle of Wight
World War I destroyers of the United Kingdom